Bubble Trouble is a 1953 short subject directed by Jules White starring American slapstick comedy team The Three Stooges (Moe Howard, Larry Fine and Shemp Howard). It is the 151st entry in the series released by Columbia Pictures starring the comedians, who released 190 shorts for the studio between 1934 and 1959.

Plot
The Stooges operate a local drug store whose landlord, the cantankerous Amos Flint (Emil Sitka), informs them their lease is about to expire. Larry protests that the trio have had their establishment for a decade, and do not want to leave. As the four bicker, Flint's elderly wife Cerina (Christine McIntyre) enters the store, only to be berated by Flint for being an old hag. "25 years is enough," he coldly confirms. After he storms off, the boys take to the frail Cerina, who begins to weep that ever since she lost her beauty, Amos had threatened to leave. Both saddened and incensed, the Stooges offer Cerina their spare room in the back. Shemp, seeing this, hatches a plan to invent a "Fountain of Youth" to restore Cerina to her stunning beauty. Deeming the idea "tremendous, colossal and putrid," the Stooges flee to their pharmaceutical lab and mix a powerful serum.

After several false tries, the trio give Cerina a taste of their Fountain of Youth, and she transforms into a fetching beauty right before their eyes. To celebrate her return to youth, Cerina prepares a Marshmallow Jumbo layer cake. Shemp is assigned to get some marshmallows, but inadvertently retrieves bubble gum. The resulting celebration then finds the Stooges and Cerina blowing bubbles after every bite, with Shemp getting two bubbles out of his ears.

Several days later, Amos comes storming into the Stooges' drug store only to see the youthful Cerina flaunting her newfound beauty. Amos quickly reneges on his threat to evict the Stooges, and requests a dose of the youthful serum himself. However, Amos overdoses on the potent stuff, and transforms into a gorilla instead. Realizing this, he attacks the Stooges in anger. Once subdued, the Stooges get the idea to put Amos in a cage and make a mint off a traveling show involving the only talking gorilla in captivity. Moe adds that two talking gorillas would be even better and tries to get Shemp to take some of the concoction. Shemp knocks the spoon into Moe’s mouth, and the film ends with Moe acting like a gorilla.

Production notes
Bubble Trouble is a remake of All Gummed Up, using ample stock footage. The new footage was filmed on October 13, 1952, nearly one year before the film's release. Stooge critic Jon Solomon contends that this film has a significantly better plot structure than the original, All Gummed Up, though many fans do not share this opinion, noting that most of the new scenes seem forced and contrived (as was generally the case when director Jules White hastily adapted old footage). In the original, the climax occurs approximately four minutes before the end of the film, leaving room for a bubblegum cake scene. In Bubble Trouble, however, the bubblegum cake scene comes before the climax of the film. Both the original and the remake were directed by Jules White.

References

External links 
 
 
Bubble Trouble at threestooges.net

1953 films
1953 comedy films
The Three Stooges films
Columbia Pictures short films
1950s English-language films
American black-and-white films
The Three Stooges film remakes
Films directed by Jules White
American comedy short films
1950s American films